Kim Jensen (born October 24, 1961 in Brønderslev, Denmark) is former assistant national coach for the Danish women's national handball team. He was an active handballer in Brønderslev IF. He scored 91 goals and played 84 national games for the Danish men's national team. He has been an assistant for the head coaches Ulrik Wilbek, Brian Lyngholm and Jan Pytlick (two periods). His contract expired after the Olympic tournament in 2012.

References 
 DHF forlænger med Kim Jensen 
 Player stats at Danish Handball Federation 

Danish male handball players
1961 births
Living people
Danish handball coaches
Olympic coaches
People from Brønderslev
Sportspeople from the North Jutland Region